Sevadybashevo (Säwäźebaş) is a rural locality (a selo) in Tyuryushevsky Selsoviet, Buzdyaksky District, Bashkortostan, Russia. The population was 604 as of 2010. There are 10 streets.

Geography 
Sevadybashevo is located 50 km north of Buzdyak (the district's administrative centre) by road. Nizhnyaya Chatra is the nearest rural locality.

References 

Rural localities in Buzdyaksky District